Henry Schade (born 8 October 1993) is a former professional Australian rules footballer who played for the Gold Coast Football Club and Collingwood Football Club in the Australian Football League (AFL). He was the Gold Coast's first selection, number 24 overall, in the 2011 AFL Draft. The 196 cm full-back played for the North Hobart Demons in the Tasmanian Football League.

In 2010 he represented the Tassie Mariners as an overage under-16 player at the national championships, and also played in the 2011 AFL Under 18 Championships.  He was then invited to the AFL draft combine.

Schade gained his Tasmanian Certificate of Education from Guilford Young College Hobart in November 2011, days after being drafted.

Schade made his long-awaited debut in Round 5 of the 2015 AFL season, in the Suns' 64-point win over the Brisbane Lions.

At the conclusion of the 2016 season, he was delisted by Gold Coast. He was subsequently drafted by Collingwood in the 2017 rookie draft.

In April 2017 Schade held Lance "Buddy" Franklin goalless in the match against Sydney.

Statistics
 Statistics are correct to the end of the 2016 season

|- style="background-color: #eaeaea"
! scope="row" style="text-align:center" | 2012
|
| 20 || 0 || – || – || – || – || – || – || – || – || – || – || – || – || – || –
|-
! scope="row" style="text-align:center" | 2013
|
| 20 || 0 || – || – || – || – || – || – || – || – || – || – || – || – || – || –
|- style="background-color: #eaeaea"
! scope="row" style="text-align:center" | 2014
|
| 20 || 0 || – || – || – || – || – || – || – || – || – || – || – || – || – || –
|-
! scope="row" style="text-align:center" | 2015
|
| 20 || 15 || 0 || 1 || 85 || 71 || 156 || 40 || 24 || 0.0 || 0.1 || 5.7 || 4.7 || 10.4 || 2.7 || 1.6
|- style="background-color: #eaeaea"
! scope="row" style="text-align:center" | 2016
|
| 20 || 5 || 0 || 0 || 37 || 28 || 65 || 29 || 7 || 0.0 || 0.0 || 7.4 || 5.6 || 13.0 || 5.8 || 1.4
|-
! scope="row" style="text-align:center" | 2017
|
| 41 || 8 || 1 || 0 || 55 || 52 || 107 || 40 || 11 || 0.1 || 0.0 || 6.9 || 6.5 || 13.4 || 5.0 || 1.4
|- class="sortbottom"
! colspan=3| Career
! 28
! 1
! 1
! 177
! 151
! 328
! 109
! 42
! 0.04
! 0.04
! 6.3
! 5.4
! 11.7
! 3.9
! 1.5
|}

References

External links

Living people
1993 births
Australian rules footballers from Tasmania
North Hobart Football Club players
Gold Coast Football Club players
Collingwood Football Club players